Elections to Strabane District Council were held on 7 June 2001 on the same day as the other Northern Irish local government elections. The election used three district electoral areas to elect a total of 16 councillors.

Election results

Note: "Votes" are the first preference votes.

Districts summary

|- class="unsortable" align="centre"
!rowspan=2 align="left"|Ward
! % 
!Cllrs
! % 
!Cllrs
! %
!Cllrs
! %
!Cllrs
! % 
!Cllrs
!rowspan=2|TotalCllrs
|- class="unsortable" align="center"
!colspan=2 bgcolor="" | Sinn Féin
!colspan=2 bgcolor="" | SDLP
!colspan=2 bgcolor="" | DUP
!colspan=2 bgcolor="" | UUP
!colspan=2 bgcolor="white"| Others
|-
|align="left"|Derg
|bgcolor="#008800"|42.5
|bgcolor="#008800"|2
|11.3
|1
|21.5
|1
|24.7
|1
|0.0
|0
|5
|-
|align="left"|Glenelly
|24.4
|1
|17.9
|1
|bgcolor="#D46A4C"|34.6
|bgcolor="#D46A4C"|2
|23.1
|1
|0.0
|0
|5
|-
|align="left"|Mourne
|bgcolor="#008800"|50.3
|bgcolor="#008800"|4
|27.1
|2
|4.9
|0
|5.3
|0
|12.4
|0
|6
|-
|- class="unsortable" class="sortbottom" style="background:#C9C9C9"
|align="left"| Total
|40.2
|7
|19.4
|4
|18.9
|3
|16.7
|2
|4.8
|0
|16
|-
|}

District results

Derg

1997: 2 x UUP, 1 x Sinn Féin, 1 x DUP, 1 x SDLP
2001: 2 x Sinn Féin, 1 x UUP, 1 x DUP, 1 x SDLP
1997-2001 Change: Sinn Féin gain from UUP

Glenelly

1997: 2 x DUP, 1 x Sinn Féin, 1 x UUP, 1 x SDLP
2001: 2 x DUP, 1 x Sinn Féin, 1 x UUP, 1 x SDLP
1997-2001 Change: No change

Mourne

1997: 3 x SDLP, 2 x Sinn Féin, 1 x Independent Nationalist
2001: 4 x Sinn Féin, 2 x SDLP
1997-2001 Change: Sinn Féin (two seats) gain from SDLP and Independent Nationalist

References

Strabane District Council elections
Strabane